Arsthinol (INN) is an antiprotozoal agent. It was synthesized for the first time in 1949 by Ernst A.H. Friedheim by complexation of acetarsol with 2,3-dimercaptopropanol (British anti-Lewisite) and has been demonstrated to be effective against amoebiasis and yaws. It was marketed few years later by Endo Products (Balarsen, Tablets, 0.1 g).
Among trivalent organoarsenicals, arsthinol was considered as very well tolerated. Recently, it was studied for its anticancer activity.

References

Antiprotozoal agents
Acetanilides
Primary alcohols
Phenols
Organoarsenic dithiolates
Arsenic heterocycles
Arsenic(III) compounds
Sulfur heterocycles
Heterocyclic compounds with 1 ring